The 2012 AFC President's Cup was the eighth edition of the AFC President's Cup, a football competition organized by the Asian Football Confederation (AFC) for clubs from "emerging countries" in Asia.

Teams from 11 member associations entered the competition. Istiqlol became the second team from Tajikistan to win the AFC President's Cup, defeating Markaz Shabab Al-Am'ari from Palestine with a 2–1 win in the final.

Venues

Qualifying teams
The following 12 associations were represented in the 2012 AFC President's Cup.

Notes
Mongolia applied to enter the 2012 AFC President's Cup, and was approved by the AFC in November 2011, and made their debut in the competition.
Myanmar applied for upgrade to the 2012 AFC Cup, and was approved by the AFC in November 2011.

Schedule
Schedule of dates for 2012 competition.
Group stage: 3–13 May
Final stage: 24–30 September

Group stage

In the group stage, the twelve teams were divided into three groups of four teams each. Each group was played in a single round-robin format at a centralized venue. The top two teams from each group qualified for the final stage. The teams are ranked according to points (3 points for a win, 1 point for a tie, 0 points for a loss) and tie breakers are in following order:
Greater number of points obtained in the group matches between the teams concerned;
Goal difference resulting from the group matches between the teams concerned;
Greater number of goals scored in the group matches between the teams concerned;
Goal difference in all the group matches;
Greater number of goals scored in all the group matches;
Kicks from the penalty mark if only two teams are involved and they are both on the field of play;
Fewer score calculated according to the number of yellow and red cards received in the group matches; (1 point for each yellow card, 3 points for each red card as a consequence of two yellow cards, 3 points for each direct red card, 4 points for each yellow card followed by a direct red card)
Drawing of lots.

On 2 March 2012, the AFC announced that the three hosts for the qualification round were Phnom Penh Crown (Cambodia), KRL (Pakistan), and Istiqlol (Tajikistan). The draw for the group stage was held at the AFC house in Kuala Lumpur, Malaysia on 6 March 2012, 15:00 UTC+08:00.

Group A

Matches played in Pakistan (host club: KRL).
Times listed are UTC+05:00.

Group B

Matches played in Cambodia (host club: Phnom Penh Crown).
Times listed are UTC+07:00.

Group C

Matches played in Tajikistan (host club: Istiqlol).
Times listed are UTC+05:00.

Final stage
The final stage was played at a centralized venue, to be chosen from one of the final stage qualifiers. The six teams which qualified for the final stage were divided into two groups of three teams each, played in a single round-robin format. The winner from each group qualified for the single-match final to decide the title.

Phnom Penh Crown (Cambodia), Istiqlol (Tajikistan) and Dordoi Bishkek (Kyrgyzstan) showed interest to organise the finals. On 18 July 2012, the AFC Competitions Committee decided to award the hosting rights of the finals to Tajikistan, and the decision was approved by the AFC Executive Committee on 19 July 2012. The draw for the finals was held in Dushanbe on 31 July 2012, 11:00 UTC+05:00.

Times listed are UTC+05:00.

Group A

Group B

Final

Top scorers

Source:

See also
2012 AFC Champions League
2012 AFC Cup

References

External links
 

3
AFC President's Cup
AFC President's Cup
AFC President's Cup
2012
2012–13 in Pakistani football
2012
2012
2012